Joinvillea plicata is a flowering plant species, one of four in the genus Joinvillea. It is found in New Caledonia and is considered a common plant by the natives.

References

External links

Poales